The Abakada alphabet was an "indigenized" Latin alphabet adopted for the Tagalog-based Filipino national language  in 1940.

The alphabet, which contains 20 letters, was introduced in the grammar book developed by Lope K. Santos for the newly-designated national language based on Tagalog. The alphabet was officially adopted by the Institute of National Language. 

The Abakada alphabet has since been superseded by the modern Filipino alphabet adopted in 1987.

Order/collation of the Abakada
The collation of letters in the Abakada closely follows those of other Latin-based spelling systems, with the digraph ng inserted after n. 

When spelling or naming each consonant, its sound is always pronounced with an "a" at the end (e.g. "ba", "ka", etc). This is also the reason for the system’s name.

History

During the pre-Hispanic era, Old Tagalog was written using the Kawi or the Baybayin script. 
For three centuries Tagalog was written following, to some extent, the Spanish phonetic and orthographic rules.

Dr. José Rizal was one of several proponents (including Trinidad Pardo de Tavera) of reforming the orthographies of the various Philippine languages in the late 19th-century. Like other proponents, he suggested to "indigenize" the alphabet of the Philippine languages by replacing the letters C and Q with K. Initially, these reforms were not broadly adopted when they were proposed but gradually became popular into the early 20th century. 

Following the establishment of the Philippine Commonwealth in 1935, the government selected Tagalog as basis for a "national language" (i.e. Filipino). Following this, the development of a dictionary and grammar book for this "national language" started. In 1939, Lope K. Santos developed the Ang Balarila ng Wikang Pambansa (The Grammar of the National Language) which, apart from containing grammar rules, contained the 20-letter alphabet designated as Abakada.

The Abakada was replaced in 1976 with an expanded alphabet containing an additional 11 letters (C, CH, F, J, LL, Ñ, Q, RR, V, X, and Z) which was in turn replaced with the current 28-letter modern alphabet. At present, all languages of the Philippines may be written using the modern Filipino alphabet (officially adopted in 1987), which includes all the letters of the Abakada.

See also
Filipino alphabet
Filipino orthography
Dambana
Baybayin
Kawi script
Philippine Braille

References

Latin alphabets
Orthographies by language
Filipino language
Tagalog language
Cebuano language
Hiligaynon language
Ilocano language
1940 introductions
1940 in the Philippines